Reichenburg railway station is a railway station in the Swiss canton of Schwyz and municipality of Reichenburg. The station is located on the Lake Zurich left-bank railway line, owned by the Swiss Federal Railways (SBB).

Layout and connections 
Reichenburg has a  island platform with two tracks ( 3–4). PostAuto Schweiz operates bus services from the station to Uznach.

Services 
 the following services stop at Reichenburg:

References

External links
 
 

Railway stations in the canton of Schwyz
Swiss Federal Railways stations